This is a list of the principal Ministers of the Crown of the Kingdom of England, and then of the Kingdom of Great Britain, from May 1702, at the beginning of the reign of Queen Anne. During this period, the leaders of the ministry were Lord Godolphin and the Duke of Marlborough.

On 8 August 1710 Godolphin was dismissed and the Harley ministry took power.

History
Upon Queen Anne's accession to the English throne in 1702, she appointed Lord Godolphin as Lord High Treasurer and the Duke of Marlborough as Master-General of the Ordnance (among other numerous appointments). They would lead this coalition of Tories and Whigs until 1708, one year after the Act of Union formed the Kingdom of Great Britain. There were three phases to the ministry.  From 1702 to 1704 the ministry was largely Tory – Godolphin and Marlborough themselves were Tories, as were the Earl of Nottingham and Sir Charles Hedges, the Secretaries of State.  After Nottingham's resignation in 1704, Godolphin and Marlborough turned for support to the "Country" Whigs, led by Speaker Robert Harley.  Not long after, the Whig complexion of the ministry grew, as Godolphin sought the support of Harley's opponents, the second Whig Junto, bringing the Earl of Sunderland in to replace Hedges as Secretary of State in 1706, and other Junto allies like Sir William Cowper began to be appointed to positions of power.  The leading ministers looked favourably on the Junto's strong support for the War of the Spanish Succession. Harley at this point began to turn against the ministry and towards the opposition Tories, and his resignation in 1708 left the government largely in the hands of the Junto for its last two years, with Sunderland as Secretary of State, Lord Somers as Lord President of the Council, the Earl of Orford as First Lord of the Admiralty, and the Earl of Wharton as Lord Lieutenant of Ireland.  The ministry finally collapsed in 1710 when Queen Anne turned to Harley and the Tories, dismissing Godolphin and the Junto Whigs, and, soon after, Marlborough himself.

List of ministers

See also
1st Parliament of Great Britain 1705–1708
2nd Parliament of Great Britain 1708–1710

References
  Chris Cook and John Stevenson, British Historical Facts 1688–1760, Macmillan 1988, p. 33–35
 World Statesmen

English ministries
British ministries
1700s in England
1700s in Great Britain
Ministries of Anne, Queen of Great Britain
1702 establishments in England
1710 disestablishments in Great Britain
1710s in Great Britain